Deputy Chief of the Naval Staff (DCNS) may refer to:
 Deputy Chief of the Naval Staff (India)
 Deputy Chief of the Naval Staff (Pakistan)
 Deputy Chief of the Naval Staff (United Kingdom)
 Deputy Chief of the Naval Staff (Australia)